This is a list of awards and nominations for Doris Day.

Film and television awards

Academy Awards

|-
| 1960
| Pillow Talk
| Best Actress
| 
|}

American Comedy Awards

|-
| 1991
| Herself
| Lifetime Achievement Award
| 
|}

Golden Globe Awards

|-
| 1955
| Herself
| Henrietta Award (World Film Favorite – Female)
| 
|-
| 1958
| Herself
| Henrietta Award (World Film Favorite – Female)
| 
|-
| 1959
| The Tunnel of Love
| Actress in a Leading Role – Musical or Comedy
| 
|-
| 1960
| Pillow Talk
| Actress in a Leading Role – Musical or Comedy
| 
|-
| 1960
| Herself
| Henrietta Award (World Film Favorite – Female)
| 
|-
| 1961
| Midnight Lace
| Best Performance by an Actress in a Motion Picture – Drama
| 
|-
| 1963
| Billy Rose's Jumbo
| Actress in a Leading Role – Musical or Comedy
| 
|-
| 1963
| Herself
| Henrietta Award (World Film Favorite – Female)
| 
|-
| 1964
| Move Over, Darling
| Actress in a Leading Role – Musical or Comedy
| 
|-
| 1966
| Herself
| Henrietta Award (World Film Favorite – Female)
| 
|-
| 1969
| The Doris Day Show
| Actress in a Television Series
| 
|-
| 1989
| Herself
| Cecil B. DeMille Award
| 
|}

Laurel Awards

|-
| 1950
| Herself
| Leading New Female Personality
| 
|-
| 1957
| Herself
| Top Female Star
| 
|-
| 1958
| Herself
| Top Female Star
| 
|-
| 1959
| Herself
| Top Female Star
| 
|-
| 1960
| Herself
| Top Female Star
| 
|-
| 1960
| Pillow Talk
| Top Female Comedy Performance
| 
|-
| 1961
| Herself
| Top Female Star
| 
|-
| 1962
| Herself
| Top Female Star
| 
|-
| 1962
| Lover come back
| Top Female Comedy Performance
| 
|-
| 1963
| Herself
| Top Female Star
| 
|-
| 1963
| That Touch of Mink
| Top Female Comedy Performance
| 
|-
| 1964
| Herself
| Top Female Star
| 
|-
| 1965
| Send me no Flowers
| Top Female Comedy Performance
| 
|-
|}

Los Angeles Film Critics Association Awards

|-
| 2011
| Herself
| Career Achievement Award
| 
|}

Music awards

Grammy Awards

|-
| 2009
| Herself
| Grammy Lifetime Achievement Award
| 
|-
| 1960
| Herself
| Best Vocal Performance Single Record or Track Female for "The Sound of Music"
| 
|-
| 1958
| Herself
| Best Vocal Performance Female for "Everybody loves a Lover"
| 
|}

Grammy Hall of Fame

|-
| 1998
| "Sentimental Journey"
| Inducted Song
| 
|-
| 1999
| "Secret Love"
| Inducted Song
| 
|-
| 2012
| "Que Sera, Sera (Whatever Will Be, Will Be)"
| Inducted Song
| 
|}

References

External links 

awards
Lists of awards received by American actor